Elisabeth of Denmark (25 August 1573 – 19 July 1625) was duchess consort of Brunswick-Lüneburg as married to Duke Henry Julius of Brunswick-Lüneburg. She was regent of Brunswick-Lüneburg in 1616–1622.

Life
She was the eldest daughter of King Frederick II of Denmark and his spouse Sophie of Mecklenburg-Güstrow. First raised with her maternal grand parents, she returned to Denmark in 1579. 
 
Scottish ambassadors had at first concentrated their suit on Elisabeth as a prospective wife for King James VI of Scotland, but King Frederick betrothed Elisabeth to the Duke of Brunswick, promising the Scots instead that "for the second daughter Anna, if the King did like her, he should have her".

There were also other suitors for the princess. In addition to James VI of Scotland, Archduke Matthias of Austria (later Emperor Matthias) also had plans for a marriage to her, and during a visit to Denmark in February 1587, he had spoken to Frederick II about this, but nothing came of it, unknown for what reason. Presumably there have been religious concerns about this.

She was married on 19 April 1590 at Kronborg Castle to Duke Henry Julius of Brunswick-Lüneburg. James VI gave gifts of jewels at the wedding worth 4,000 Danish dalers. When her future spouse first arrived for the wedding in 1590, he disguised himself as a jeweler; he presented her with jewelry, and stated that prize was her body. As a result, he was thrown in jail until he could prove his identity and explain that it had been a joke.

As duchess, she remained in close correspondence with her brother, the Danish monarch. In September 1598 Scottish ambassadors David Cunningham and Peter Young came to Gröningen Priory seeking support for James VI's succession to the English throne. Henry Julius gave a cautious reply and in a separate letter Elizabeth replied that she had been ill for several months and had made a moderate recovery.

After the death of her husband in 1613, she reigned in her dowry. In 1616, she removed her son, Friederich Ulrich, from the government with the support of her brother, Christian IV of Denmark-Norway, because of his alcoholism. She resumed the regency, and she remained in charge for the next six years, assisted by Anton von Streithorst. She received a visit from her brother Christian in 1616.

In 1617, she founded the Retreat for the Poor with a chapel, Elisabeth Stift. During the Thirty Years War (1618–1648) the castle was raided and was not repaired until 1654.

Issue
 Frederick Ulrich, Duke of Brunswick-Lüneburg (15 April 1591 – 21 August 1634)
 Sophia Hedwig of Brunswick-Wolfenbüttel (20 February 1592 – 23 January 1642), married Ernest Casimir, Prince of Nassau-Dietz
 Elisabeth of Brunswick-Wolfenbüttel (23 June 1593 – 25 March 1650), married Augustus, Duke of Saxony, and John Philip, Duke of Saxe-Altenburg
 Hedwig of Brunswick-Wolfenbüttel (19 February 1595 – 26 June 1650), married Ulrich, Duke of Pomerania
 Dorothea of Brunswick-Wolfenbüttel (8 July 1596 – 1 September 1643), married Christian William of Brandenburg, son of Joachim III Frederick, Elector of Brandenburg
 Heinrich Julius of Brunswick-Wolfenbüttel (7 October 1597 – 11 July 1606)
 Christian the Younger of Brunswick-Wolfenbüttel (20 September 1599 – 16 July 1626)
 Rudolph of Brunswick-Wolfenbüttel (15 June 1602 – 13 June 1616)
 Heinrich Karl of Brunswick-Wolfenbüttel (4 September 1609 – 11 June 1615)
 Anna Augusta of Brunswick-Wolfenbüttel (19 May 1612 – 17 February 1673), married George Louis, Count of Nassau-Dillenburg

Ancestry

References 

 Dansk biografisk Lexikon / IV. Bind. Clemens - Eynden (in Danish)

Middle House of Brunswick
Danish princesses
Norwegian princesses
Duchesses of Brunswick-Lüneburg
1573 births
1626 deaths
17th-century women rulers
Children of Frederick II of Denmark
Daughters of kings